Yehya is a given name. Notable people with the name include:

Yehya Ablikim (born 1988), Chinese football player
Yehya Bundhun (born 1965), Mauritius sportsman (archery, volleyball)
Mohamad Yehya Al Rashed (born 1982), Syrian football player

See also
Yahya (name)
Yihyah